Adesmia ameghinoi is an endemic perennial shrub found in Argentina.

References

ameghinoi
Taxa named by Carlo Luigi Spegazzini